Walter Adams was an English professional footballer who played as a winger. He played in the Football League for Middlesbrough Ironopolis.

References

English footballers
Association football wingers
Middlesbrough Ironopolis F.C. players
Year of death missing
19th-century births